Istvan Raskovy  (25 November 1936 – 31 May 2021) was an Australian wrestler. He competed in the men's Greco-Roman middleweight at the 1964 Summer Olympics. In the 1986 Queen's Birthday Honours, Roskovy was awarded the Medal of the Order of Australia (OAM) for "service to wrestling".

References

External links
 

1936 births
2021 deaths
Australian male sport wrestlers
Olympic wrestlers of Australia
Wrestlers at the 1964 Summer Olympics
Place of birth missing
Recipients of the Medal of the Order of Australia